Martin Dugard (born June 1, 1961 in Maine) is an American author living in Rancho Santa Margarita, Orange County, California. He and his wife have three sons.

Dugard began writing professionally in 1988. Bored by an unfulfilling corporate marketing job, he began writing articles for endurance sports magazines such as Competitor and Runner's World in the mornings and on weekends. In 1993, inspired after covering the Raid Gauloises adventure race in Madagascar, Dugard left the corporate world to pursue a full-time writing career. Although he has returned to journalism from time to time, as when covering the Tour de France from 1999 to 2008, Dugard's primary focus is writing narrative non-fiction. Dugard wrote his first work of history in 2000.

Works
Martin Dugard's works include:
 The Explorers  
 Surviving the Toughest Race on Earth 
 Into Africa: The dramatic retelling of the Stanley-Livingstone story, 
 The Last Voyage of Columbus. 
 The Training Ground: Grant, Lee, Sherman, and Davis in the Mexican War, 1846–1848 
 To Be a Runner: How Racing Up Mountains, Running with the Bulls, or Just Taking on a 5-K Makes You a Better Person (and the World a Better place) 

Co-written with Bill O'Reilly
 Killing Lincoln: The Shocking Assassination that Changed America Forever 
 Killing Kennedy: The End of Camelot 
 Killing Jesus: A History 
 Killing Patton: The Strange Death of World War II's Most Audacious General 
 Killing Reagan: A Violent Assault That Changed a Presidency 
 Killing the Rising Sun: How America Vanquished World War II Japan 
 Killing England: The Brutal Struggle for American Independence 
 Killing the SS: The Hunt for the Worst War Criminals in History 
 Killing Crazy Horse: The Merciless Indian Wars in America 
 Killing the Mob: The Fight Against Organized Crime in America 
 Killing the Killers: The Secret War Against Terrorists 
 Killing the Legends: The Lethal Danger of Celebrity. St. Martin's Press. 

His 2008 screenplay, A Warrior's Heart, was released as a feature film starring Kellan Lutz and Ashley Greene. It was also presented at the Cannes Film Festival in 2011 and was released in the United States on 2 December 2011.

For a number of years, Dugard wrote a daily blog entitled The Paper Kenyan offering readers a daily riff on history, endurance sports, and travel. He still blogs from time to time, though on a much less frequent basis.

References

External links
Martin Dugard's blog The Paper Kenyan

https://web.archive.org/web/20140728213331/http://www.jserra.org/apps/pages/index.jsp?uREC_ID=124045&type=u
https://archive.today/20140120000019/http://jserrablog.com/2011/06/29/coach-of-the-year-martin-dugard-shares/

1961 births
Living people
Writers from Maine
American non-fiction writers
American male screenwriters
People from Rancho Santa Margarita, California
Bill O'Reilly (political commentator)
American male non-fiction writers
Screenwriters from California